Verdun is a neighbourhood in the Nou Barris district of Barcelona.

Neighbourhoods of Barcelona
Nou Barris